In 2018, two firms in Spain ranked among the world's biggest publishers of books in terms of revenue: Grupo Planeta and Grupo Santillana. In 2013, there were 524,213 titles in print in Spain, including 76,434 new titles.

History

"The first Spanish press was set up in 1473 at Valencia, where the German trading company of Ravensburg had an important base.... Publishing flourished in the early period at Barcelona, Burgos, Zaragoza, Seville, and the university towns of Salamanca and Alcalá de Henares." The Instituto Nacional del Libro Español (National Book Institute) formed in 1941. As of 2004 Spain had some 2,000+ book publishers in the private sector, including , and Prisa. As of 2013 there were 809 publishing enterprises.

The United Nations Educational, Scientific and Cultural Organization designated Madrid the 2001 World Book Capital.

Booksellers

Fairs

Collections

 Biblioteca Colombina, Seville
 , in Burgos

See also

 Collection (publishing)
 Copyright law of Spain
 Legal deposit: Spain
 Book publishing companies of Spain (es) Spanish literature
 Media of Spain
 
 
 
 
 
 Spanish children's books
 University College Dublin's Iberian Books project (est. 2007)

Notes

ReferencesThis article incorporates information from the Spanish Wikipedia.''

Bibliography
in English
 
 
 
  
 
 
 
 V. F. Goldsmith, A Short Title Catalogue of Spanish and Portuguese Books 1601-1700 in the Library of the British Museum. 1974
 
  
  
 
 Printing in Spain and Portugal before 1501, p. 359?+
 16th Century: Spain and Portugal, p. 412+
 17th Century: Spain, p. 441+
 18th Century: Spain and Portugal, p. 471+
 
 
 
 
 
  2010-
 
 
 
 

in Spanish
 
 
 
 
  1958-
 

in other languages

External links

 Federación de Gremios de Editores de España (publisher association)
  (Bibliography of editions published in Spain; also browsable by town)
  
  (Bibliography)

spain
Mass media in Spain
Book publishing in Spain
 
Libraries in Spain